Local elections were held in Bohol on May 9, 2016, as part of the 2016 Philippine general election. Registered voters elected leaders for local positions: a city or town mayor, vice mayor and town councilors, as well as three to four members of the Sangguniang Panlalawigan, the vice-governor, governor and  three representatives for the three districts of Bohol.

By the end of voters' registration last October 2015, the total number of registered voters in Bohol is 798,768. There is 2.96% or equivalent to 22,983 increase in the number of voters registered from 775,785 voter population last 2013.

37 hopefuls filed their certificates of candidacy (COC) for 15 provincial elective positions in time for the deadline for the filing of certificates of candidacy on October 16, 2012. Based on the official list of provincial Commission on Elections, 5 aspirants run for governor, 2 for vice-governors, 23 for provincial board members, and 7 for congressman in three districts. Also in the whole province, there 104 candidates for mayor, 103 aspirants are vying for vice mayor, and 812 bets for municipal or city councilor.

Provincial Election Results

Governor
Edgar Chatto is the incumbent. He won by landslide for his third consecutive term as governor. 

≥u

Vice-Governor
Atty. Dionisio D. Balite, a seasoned public servant whose political career spans fifty years starting out as town councilor and then municipal mayor of his hometown of Valencia, is the newly elected Vice-Governor of Bohol. Balite had served several terms as Senior Board Member of the Sangguniang Panlalawigan (SP). He had one more term left in the SP, when he decided it was time to vie for the vice-governorship. Up until then, the incumbent Vice-Governor did not face any strong contender for the position.

Sangguniang Panlalawigan

1st District
Voter Population (2016):  268,381
Parties are as stated in their certificates of candidacy. Christopher Bangalao and Manuelito Bama-at both of PDP–Laban withdrew their candidacies. 

|bgcolor=black colspan=5|

 Substituted Dante Salva (PDP–Laban).

2nd District
Voter Population (2016):  257,827
Parties are as stated in their certificates of candidacy. 

|bgcolor=black colspan=5|

3rd District
Voter Population (2016):  272,560
Parties are as stated in their certificates of candidacy. 

|bgcolor=black colspan=5|

 Replaced Porferio Datoy after withdrawing candidacy.

Congressional Election Results

1st District, Congressman
City: Tagbilaran City
Municipality: Alburquerque, Antequera, Baclayon, Balilihan, Calape, Catigbian, Corella, Cortes, Dauis, Loon, Maribojoc, Panglao, Sikatuna, Tubigon
Population (2010):  415,420

Rene Relampagos is the incumbent.

≥u

2nd District, Congressman
City: none
Municipality: Bien Unido, Buenavista, Clarin, Dagohoy, Danao, Getafe, Inabanga, Pres. Carlos P. Garcia, Sagbayan, San Isidro, San Miguel, Talibon, Trinidad, Ubay
Population (2010):  415,878

Erico Aristotle Aumentado is the incumbent.

≥u

3rd District, Congressman
City: none
Municipality: Alicia, Anda, Batuan, Bilar, Candijay, Carmen, Dimiao, Duero, Garcia Hernandez, Guindulman, Jagna, Lila, Loay, Loboc, Mabini, Pilar, Sevilla, Sierra Bullones, Valencia
Population (2010):  423,830
Arthur Yap is the incumbent. He is vying for his third and last term as congressman. Former Carmen mayor Conchita Toribio-delos Reyes challenged him for the seat. This is also the first time that Yap is running with an opponent.  

≥u

City and Municipal Election Results
All municipalities of Bohol and Tagbilaran City elected mayor, vice-mayor and councilors this election. The mayor and vice mayor with the highest number of votes win the seat; they are voted separately, therefore, they may be of different parties when elected. Below is the list of Mayoral and vice-Mayoral candidates of each city and municipalities in three districts.

First District
Parties are as stated in their certificates of candidacy.

Tagbilaran City

Voter Population (2016):  59,949
John Geesnell Yap and Jose Antonio Veloso are the incumbent mayor and vice-mayor, running for reelection.

Alburquerque
Voter Population (2016):  6,698
Efren Tungol and Cayetano Doria Jr. are the incumbents. Tungol withdrew his candidacy before the deadline last December 10, 2015 and nominated his youngest son Alfren Charles Tungol as a mayoral candidate under LP. On the other hand, incumbent vice-mayor Cayetano Doria Jr. is running unopposed.

 Substituted his father, incumbent mayor Efren Tungol (LP).

Antequera
Voter Population (2016):  8,691

Baclayon
Voter Population (2016):  12,166

Balilihan

Incumbent Mayor and Bohol First Lady Pureza Veloso-Chatto is seeking her first full term.  Elected as vice mayor in 2013, Veloso-Chatto assumed the mayorship upon the death of then Mayor Dominisio "Domie" Chatto on July 23, 2015.  Her running mate is former first councilor and incumbent Vice Mayor Edgar Asilo, who assumed the vice mayorship as provided by law.

Voter Population (2016):  11,556

Calape
Voter Population (2016):  20,449
Incumbent mayor Sulpicio Yu Jr. is running for vice-mayor unopposed. He switched with his brother, incumbent vice-mayor Nelson Yu who is now vying for mayor of the town.

Catigbian
Voter Population (2016):  13,832

Corella
Jose Nicanor Tocmo and Maria Asuncion Banal-Daquio are the incumbent mayor and vice mayor, all vying for reelection. 
Voter Population (2016):  5,140

 Substituted Cecilia Salang-Daquio (LP), who earlier withdrew her candidacy.

Cortes
Voter Population (2016):  10,566
Roberto Tabanera is the incumbent. He was challenged by the incumbent vice-mayor Lynn Iven Paña-Lim.

Dauis
Voter Population (2016):  26,470
Marietta Tocmo-Sumaylo and Luciano Bongalos are the incumbent mayor and vice-mayor, all running for reelection.

 Substituted Renaldo Yana (PDP–Laban), who withdrew his candidacy.

Loon
Voter Population (2016):  27,676
Incumbent mayor Lloyd Peter Lopez is now running for vice-mayor in exchange with incumbent vice-mayor Elvi Peter Relampagos, who is vying for mayor of the town.

Maribojoc
Voter Population (2016):  12,753

Panglao
Voter Population (2016):  21,394

Sikatuna
Voter Population (2016):  4,647
Incumbent mayor Jose Ellorimo Jr. is running unopposed. His vice-mayor,  Julian Manigo is also vying for reelection.

Tubigon
Voter Population (2016):  26,394

Second District
Parties are as stated in their certificates of candidacy.

Bien Unido
Incumbent Niño Rey Boniel is on his third term and is ineligible to run. He is running for 2nd District board member His wife, Gisela Bendong-Boniel is running in his place.
Voter Population (2016):  15,858

Rene Borenaga is the incumbent.

Buenavista
Voter Population (2016):  16,813

Clarin
Voter Population (2016):  13,743
Incumbent Allen Ray Piezas is running for reelection while his vice mayor, Velden Aparicio is unopposed.

Dagohoy
Voter Population (2016):  11,228

Danao
Voter Population (2016):  12,212
Incumbent mayor Natividad Gonzaga is not running. Her son, incumbent vice-mayor Louis Thomas Gonzaga is running for mayor unopposed. However, the latter Gonzaga died on May 6, 2016, 3 days before election at age 46.  Incumbent mayor Natividad Gonzaga is expected to substitute on her son's vacated seat.

Getafe
Voter Population (2016):  18,576
Incumbent mayor Casey Shaun Camacho is running for reelection unopposed. Incumbent vice mayor Eduardo Torremocha is also vying for reelection.

Inabanga
Voter Population (2016):  25,979

Pres. Carlos P. Garcia
Voter Population (2016):  14,455

Sagbayan
Voter Population (2016):  14,394
Incumbent mayor Ricardo Suarez is seeking reelection unopposed. Incumbent vice-mayor Charito Piezas-Lao is running for reelection.

Substituted Desiree Grace Lapatan-Amores (UNA), who earlier withdrew her candidacy.

San Isidro
Voter Population (2016):  6,509

San Miguel
Voter Population (2016):  14,040
Incumbent mayor Claudio C. Bonior is ineligible for reelection due to term-limits.  His party nominated incumbent vice-mayor Jonathan Reyes for mayor. On the other hand, incumbent first councilor Faustino Bulaga is vying for vice-mayor unopposed.

Talibon
Voter Population (2016):  33,211

Trinidad
Voter Population (2016):  19,017

Ubay
Voter Population (2016):  41,792

Third District
Parties are as stated in their certificates of candidacy.

Alicia
Voter Population (2016):  13,423

Anda
Voter Population (2016):  11,852

Batuan
Voter Population (2016):  8,359

Bilar
Voter Population (2016):  11,565

Candijay
Voter Population (2016):  19,708

Carmen
Voter Population (2016):  29,767

Dimiao
Voter Population (2016):  9,965

Duero
Voter Population (2016):  12,150

Garcia Hernandez
Voter Population (2016):  14,484

Guindulman
Voter Population (2016):  20,529

Jagna
Voter Population (2016):  20,459

Lila
Voter Population (2016):  6,835
For the two consecutive elections, incumbent mayor Regina Cahiles-Salazar is running unopposed.

Loay
Voter Population (2016):  11,777

Loboc
Voter Population (2016):  11,472

Mabini
Voter Population (2016):  16,609

Pilar
Voter Population (2016):  16,152

Sevilla
Voter Population (2016):  7,156

Sierra Bullones
Voter Population (2016):  15,053

Valencia
Voter Population (2016):  15,245
Incumbent mayor Maria Katrina Lim is seeking for reelection. Incumbent councilor Calixto Garcia is running for vice-mayor unopposed.

References

External links
COMELEC - Official website of the Philippine Commission on Elections (COMELEC)
NAMFREL - Official website of National Movement for Free Elections (NAMFREL)
PPCRV - Official website of the Parish Pastoral Council for Responsible Voting (PPCRV)

2016 Philippine local elections